Little France may refer to:

 Little France, a district of Edinburgh, Scotland
 Little France (castle), a castle in Rhineland-Palatinate, Germany
 Little France, New York, a village in New York State, USA

See also
 Petty France (disambiguation)
 Petite France (disambiguation)